Martin Stimming (born December 1983), better known under his stage name Stimming, is a Hamburg-based music producer. He is well known for using hand-made sounds and field recordings in his compositions, and crafting improvised sounds during live sets.

Music

Born in Giessen, and raised in Butzbach, both near Frankfurt, Stimming is a classically-trained musician; he played the violin, piano and drums at age ten. At sixteen, Stimming began producing electronic music, moving to Hamburg at nineteen to attend SAE Institute (School of Audio Engineering) where he did an Electronic Music Producer course.

In 2006 Stimming met DJs and producers Solomun and Adriano who had just launched their label Diynamic that year. He started releasing under Diynamic, having to date released four albums with the label as well as multiple singles. Many of Stimming's releases under Diynamic are of a classically-informed nature, including analogue instrument samples such as the violin. Stimming's music has been characterized by “heartstring-tugging tunes and acoustic feel.”

In 2008, Stimming had his breakthrough hit, “Una Pena”, which contained worked vocals by the Chilean folklore-singer Violeta Parra. In 2009 Stimming released his debut album “Reflections” to great acclaim earning him an Ibiza DJ Award in the category of ‘Best Newcomer’ in 2010. In 2012 Stimming and a friend reworked his track “November Morning” into a classical arrangement, and had the new version performed by the Brandenburgisches Staatsorchester Frankfurt (Oder) and recorded. Stimming's third album, Stimming, was recorded on the Baltic coast and released in 2013. In 2016 Stimming released his fourth, and most conceptual, LP Alpe Lusia which was mostly produced over the period of one month in a secluded cabin in the Dolomites in Northern Italy. In 2018 Stimming released his fifth album Exodus, in cooperation with the German neo-classical pianist, Lambert (pianist) via the Berlin-based Kryptox label. Also in 2018, Stimming was awarded the German Music Authors' Prize#2018 in the Composition Dance/Elektro category.

Stimming has also released various remixes for the likes of Claude VonStroke, Nina Kraviz, Stephan Bodzin and Robert Babicz,  Marc Romboy, Kiasmos and Deadmau5 amongst others. Stimming worked with the South African vocalist Lazarusman early in his career earning him a loyal fan base in the country, where he frequently performs and visit.

Stimming has cited DJ Krush and Amon Tobin as influences on his music.

Live performances

Stimming has performed at numerous festivals worldwide including Diynamic Festival and Into The Woods festival in The Netherlands, Babylon Festival in Australia, Fusion Festival and Melt! Festival in Germany, Open Space Festival in France, The BPM Festival in Mexico and Rage Festival, South Africa.

Equipment

Stimming is well known for incorporating the latest technology into his songs, working on a versatile range of equipment both in the studio and on live sets. He refuses to work with a mouse and keyboard, opting instead for pen-display equipment.  He has also performed music on the 4D sound system. Stimming has reviewed several electronic music equipment in videos online for Electronic Beats TV. He has also stated he has never used a repeated sample in his work. Stimming frequently uses field recordings from mundane objects such as a coffee machine, children's toys or loose change in his recordings, and has admitted to taking his tape recorder everywhere he goes.

Stimming produces with a touch based version of the digital audio workstation Bitwig.
For live performances, Stimming uses an Elektron Octatrack, Roland SH-101 along with other customised mastering solutions.

Discography
 2009 - Reflections, Diynamic Music
 2011 - Liquorice, Diynamic Music
 2013 - Stimming, Diynamic Music
 2016 - Alpe Lusia, Diynamic Music
 2018 - Stimming X Lambert - Exodus, Kryptox
 2021 - Stimming X Lambert - Positive

References 

Musicians from Hamburg
German record producers
German electronic musicians
People from Giessen
German DJs
1983 births
Living people